MAM domain is an evolutionary conserved protein domain. It is an extracellular domain found in many receptors.

A 170 amino acid domain, the so-called MAM (meprin, A-5 protein, and receptor protein-tyrosine phosphatase mu) domain, has been recognised in the extracellular region of functionally diverse proteins. These proteins have a modular, receptor-like architecture comprising a signal peptide, an N-terminal extracellular domain, a single transmembrane domain and an intracellular domain. Such proteins include meprin (a cell surface glycoprotein); A5 antigen (a developmentally-regulated cell surface protein; Xenopus nrp1); and receptor-like tyrosine protein phosphatase. The MAM domain is thought to have an adhesive function. It contains 4 conserved cysteine residues, which probably form disulphide bridges.

Human proteins containing this domain 
ALK;       EGFL6;     MAMDC2;    MAMDC4;    MDGA1;     MDGA2;     MEP1A;     MEP1B;     
NPNT;      NRP1;      NRP2;      PRSS7;     PTPRK;     PTPRM;     PTPRO;     PTPRT;     
PTPRU;     ZAN

References

Protein domains
Single-pass transmembrane proteins